Jei Beibi (phonetic pronunciation of "Hey Baby" in Spanish) is the eighth studio album by Mexican band, Café Tacuba, released on May 5, 2017. It is their first album in five years. Having fulfilled their recording contract with Universal Music México, they decided to record future projects independently. A single, "Un Par de Lugares" was recorded during the Jei Beibi sessions but was left off the final album. Three singles were eventually released from the album: "Futuro", "Que No", and "Disolviéndonos". The band embarked on the Niu Güéis (New Ways) Tour to promote the album. The album won the Latin Grammy Award for Best Alternative Music Album in 2018. This is the first album in which lead singer Rubén Albarrán does not use a pseudonym.

Track listing
All tracks written by Café Tacuba, except where noted.

Personnel
Rubén Albarrán – vocals, guitars
Emmanuel del Real – keyboards, programming, percussion, vocals
Joselo Rangel – guitar, vocals
Quique Rangel – bass

Charts

References

2017 albums
Café Tacuba albums
Albums produced by Gustavo Santaolalla
Spanish-language albums
Latin Grammy Award for Best Alternative Music Album